Aristotelia articulata is a moth of the family Gelechiidae. It was described by Edward Meyrick in 1918. It is found in southern India.

The forewings are fuscous, the base whitish sprinkled and with a pale ochreous line along the fold, posteriorly suffused into the ground colour. There is an oblique white fascia sprinkled fuscous at one-fourth and a broader oblique white median fascia irrorated (sprinkled) with fuscous, both edges indented in the middle, the space between this and the preceding darker fuscous except dorsally. A short slender longitudinal black streak is found in the disc beyond this and there is a marginal series of white dots on the costa towards the apex and termen. The hindwings are light grey.

References

Moths described in 1918
Aristotelia (moth)
Moths of Asia